Eupithecia kozhantschikovi is a moth in the family Geometridae. It is found in Russia.

References

Moths described in 1929
kozhantschikovi
Moths of Asia